Richard Evan Schwartz (born August 11, 1966) is an American mathematician notable for his contributions to geometric group theory and to an area of mathematics known as billiards. Geometric group theory is a relatively new area of mathematics beginning around the late 1980s which explores finitely generated groups, and seeks connections between their algebraic properties and the geometric spaces on which these groups act. He has worked on what mathematicians refer to as billiards, which are dynamical systems based on a convex shape in a plane. He has explored geometric iterations involving polygons, and he has been credited for developing the mathematical concept known as the pentagram map. In addition, he is a bestselling author of a mathematics picture book for young children. His published work usually appears under the name Richard Evan Schwartz. In 2018 he is a professor of mathematics at Brown University.

Career
Schwartz was born in Los Angeles on August 11, 1966. He attended John F. Kennedy High School in Los Angeles from 1981 to 1984, then earned a B. S. in mathematics from U.C.L.A. in 1987, and then a Ph. D. in mathematics from Princeton University in 1991 under the supervision of William Thurston. He taught at the University of Maryland. He is currently the Chancellor's Professor of Mathematics at Brown University. He lives with his wife and two daughters in Barrington, Rhode Island.

Schwartz is credited by other mathematicians for introducing the concept of the pentagram map.
According to Schwartz's conception, a convex polygon would be inscribed with diagonal lines inside it, by drawing a line from one point to the next point—that is, by skipping over the immediate point on the polygon. The intersection points of the diagonals would form an inner polygon, and the process could be repeated. Schwartz observed these geometric patterns, partly by experimenting with computers. 
He has collaborated with mathematicians Valentin Ovsienko 
and Sergei Tabachnikov 
to show that the pentagram map is "completely integrable."

In his spare time he draws comic books, writes computer programs, listens to music and exercises. He admired the late Russian mathematician Vladimir Arnold and dedicated a paper to him. He played an April Fool's joke on fellow mathematics professors at Brown University by sending an email suggesting that students could be admitted randomly, along with references to bogus studies which purportedly suggested that there were benefits to having a certain population of the student body selected at random; the story was reported in the Brown Daily Herald. Colleagues such as mathematician Jeffrey Brock describe Schwartz as having a "very wry sense of humor."

In 2003, Schwartz was teaching one of his young daughters about number basics and developed a poster of the first 100 numbers using colorful monsters. This project gelled into a mathematics book for young children published in 2010, entitled You Can Count on Monsters, which became a bestseller. Each monster has a graphic which gives a mini-lesson about its properties, such as being a prime number or a lesson about factoring; for example, the graphic monster for the number five was a five-sided star or pentagram.  A year after publication, it was featured prominently on National Public Radio in January 2011 and became a bestseller for a few days on the online bookstore Amazon as well as earning international acclaim. 
The Los Angeles Times suggested that the book helped to "take the scariness out of arithmetic." 
Mathematician Keith Devlin, on NPR, agreed, saying that Schwartz "very skillfully and subtly embeds mathematical ideas into the drawings."

Publications

Selected contributions
The quasi-isometry classification of rank one lattices: Any quasi-isometry of a hyperbolic lattice is equivalent to a commensurator.
A proof of the 1989 Goldman–Parker conjecture: This is a complete description of the moduli space of the complex hyperbolic ideal triangle groups.
A proof that a triangle has a periodic billiard path provided all its angles are less than 100 degrees
A solution of the 1960 Moser–Neumann problem: There exists an outer billiards system with an unbounded orbit.
A solution of the 5-electron case of J. J. Thomson's 1904 problem: The triangular bipyramid is the configuration of 5 electrons on the sphere that minimizes the Coulomb potential.
The introduction of the pentagram map and a later proof (with Sergei Tabachnikov and Valentin Ovsienko) of its complete integrability.

Corresponding articles
R. E. Schwartz, "The Quasi-Isometry Classification of Rank One Lattices Publ. Math. IHES (1995) 82 133–168
R. E. Schwartz, "Ideal Triangle Groups, Dented Tori, and Numerical Analysis" Ann. of. Math (2001)
R. E. Schwartz, "Obtuse Triangular Billiards II: 100 Degrees worth of periodic billiard paths" Journal of Experimental Math (2008)
R. E. Schwartz, "Unbounded orbits for Outer Billiards", Journal of Modern Dynamics (2007)
R. E. Schwartz, "The 5-electron case of Thompson's Problem" preprint (2010).
R. E. Schwartz, "The Pentagram Map" Journal of Experimental Math (1992)
V. Ovsienko, R.E. Schwartz, S.Tabachnikov, "The Pentagram Map: A Completely Integrable System", Communications in Mathematical Physics (2010)

Published books

Spherical CR Geometry and Dehn Surgery, Annals of Mathematics Studies no. 165 (2007), Princeton University Press
Outer Billiards on Kites, Annals of Mathematics Studies no. 171 (2009)
You Can Count on Monsters, American Mathematical Society, (2015)
Mostly Surfaces, American Mathematical Society, (2011)
The Octagonal PETs, American Mathematical Society, (2014)
Really Big Numbers, American Mathematical Society, (2014) Winner of the 2015 MSRI Mathical Books for Kids from Tots to Teens Award
Gallery of the Infinite, American Mathematical Society, (2016)
The Projective Heat Map, American Mathematical Society, (2017)

Selected awards
1993 National Science Foundation Postdoctoral Fellow
1996 Sloan Research Fellow
2002 Invited Speaker, International Congress of Mathematicians, Beijing
2003 Guggenheim Fellow
2009 Clay Research Scholar
2017 class of Fellows of the American Mathematical Society "for contributions to dynamics, geometry, and experimental mathematics and for exposition".

References

External links
 Richard Evan Schwartz's Homepage
 Richard Evan Schwartz's Author Page
 Richard Evan Schwartz's published works
 Seminar talk by V Ovsienko on pentagram maps

Algebraic geometers
Additive combinatorialists
Mathematics educators
Brown University faculty
University of California, Berkeley alumni
University of California, Los Angeles alumni
American children's writers
1966 births
Living people
Fellows of the American Mathematical Society